All Hallows Catholic High School is a coeducational secondary school located in Penwortham in the English county of Lancashire.

Established in 1975, it is a Roman Catholic voluntary aided school administered by Lancashire County Council and the Roman Catholic Archdiocese of Liverpool. The school went through an extensive rebuilding programme in 2007.

All Hallows Catholic High School offers GCSEs, BTECs, Cambridge Nationals and ASDAN awards as programmes of study for pupils.

Notable former pupils
Ashley Dalton, politician
John Thomson, comedian

References

External links
All Hallows Catholic High School official website

Secondary schools in Lancashire
Catholic secondary schools in the Archdiocese of Liverpool
Educational institutions established in 1975
1975 establishments in England
Voluntary aided schools in England
Schools in South Ribble